Wardha Lok Sabha constituency  is one of the 48 Lok Sabha (parliamentary)  constituencies in Maharashtra state in western India. This constituency is spread over Amravati and Wardha districts.

Assembly segments
Presently, Wardha Lok Sabha constituency comprises six Vidhan Sabha (legislative assembly) segments. These segments are:

Members of Parliament

Election results

General elections, 2019

General elections, 2014

General election, 2009

See also
 Wardha district
 Amravati district
 List of Constituencies of the Lok Sabha

Notes

External links
 Previous Lok Sabha Members by Constituency Lok Sabha website
Wardha lok sabha  constituency election 2019 results details

Lok Sabha constituencies in Maharashtra
Wardha district
Amravati district